Rafael Nadal defeated David Nalbandian in the final, 6–2, 6–3 to win the singles tennis title at the 2013 Brasil Open.

Nicolás Almagro was the two-time defending champion, but lost in the quarterfinals to Nalbandian.

Seeds

Draw

Finals

Top half

Bottom half

Qualifying

Seeds

Qualifiers

Lucky loser

  Martín Alund

Draw

First qualifier

Second qualifier

Third qualifier

Fourth qualifier

References
 Main Draw
 Qualifying Draw

Brasil Open - Singles
2013 Brasil Open